Olav Hammer (born 1958) is a Swedish professor at the University of Southern Denmark in Odense working in the field of history of religion.

Career
Hammer has written four books in Swedish and one monograph Claiming Knowledge: Strategies of Epistemology from Theosophy to the New Age (2001) in English. This volume, which was also Hammer's doctoral dissertation in 2000 at Lund University, investigates the rhetorical strategies of legitimization of a number of related new religious movements. Hammer is also editor of several books, including Polemical Encounters (with Kocku von Stuckrad, Brill 2007), The Invention of Sacred Tradition (with James R. Lewis, Cambridge UP 2007), Alternative Christs (Cambridge UP 2009), Cambridge Companion to New Religious Movements (with Mikael Rothstein, Cambridge UP 2012), and Western Esotericism in Scandinavia (with Henrik Bogdan, Brill 2016). He was from 2009 to 2016 one of two executive editors of the journal Numen.

Awards 
  2002

References

External links
Official website
University profile webpage (archived) 

Swedish historians of religion
Swedish non-fiction writers
Academic staff of the University of Southern Denmark
Researchers of new religious movements and cults
Lund University alumni
1958 births
Living people
Date of birth missing (living people)
Place of birth missing (living people)
Western esotericism scholars
Swedish scholars and academics